Cocoseius is a genus of mites in the family Phytoseiidae.

Species
 Cocoseius elsalvador Denmark & Andrews, 1981
 Cocoseius palmarum Gondim Jr., Moraes & McMurtry, 2000

References

Phytoseiidae